The 2009 European Parliament election in Bulgaria was held on Sunday 7 June 2009 and was the election of the delegation from Bulgaria to the European Parliament. As a result of the Treaty of Nice – that became active in November 2004 – the number of Bulgarian delegates in the European Parliament decreased from 18 (in 2007) to 17 delegates. When the Treaty of Lisbon was ratified, the number of Bulgarian Delegates increased to 18 again, giving a second seat to the Blue Coalition.

Background 
This election is the first one, in which Bulgaria elects MEP for the full five-year term. Most political analysts viewed these elections as a rehearsal to the 2009 Bulgarian parliamentary election. It was speculated that if similar results were obtained on the latter elections, that the formation of government would be extremely difficult. This did not turn out to be the case.

Opinion polls

Results

Elected MEPs 
The following 18 MEP were elected:

5 MEPs from GERB that joined the European People's Party group:

 Rumiana Jeleva
 Vladimir Urutchev
 Iliana Ivanova
 Emil Stoyanov
 Maria Nedeltcheva

4 MEPs from the Coalition for Bulgaria that joined the Progressive Alliance of Socialists and Democrats:

 Ivaylo Kalfin
 Iliana Yotova
 Kristian Vigenin
 Evgeni Kirilov

3 MEPs from Movement for Rights and Freedoms that joined the Alliance of Liberals and Democrats for Europe group:

 Filiz Husmenova
 Vladko Panayotov
 Metin Kazak

2 MEPs from Attack that sat as Non-inscrits:

 Dimitar Stoyanov
 Slavcho Binev

2 MEPs from National Movement for Stability and Progress that joined the Alliance of Liberals and Democrats for Europe group:

 Meglena Kuneva
 Antonia Parvanova

1 MEP from Union of Democratic Forces that joined the European People's Party group:

 Nadezhda Mihaylova

1 MEP from Democrats for a Strong Bulgaria that joined the European People's Party group:

 Svetoslav Malinov

See also 
 2007 European Parliament election in Bulgaria
 2014 European Parliament election in Bulgaria
 2009 European Parliament election
 European Parliament elections,Bulgaria

External links 
  
 EurActiv summary of the issues and lists
 Lists on the ballot for the European Parliament election, 2009 (Bulgaria)

References 

Bulgaria
European Parliament elections in Bulgaria
2009 elections in Bulgaria

Notes